Upland Lawn is a historic home located at Cornwall in Orange County, New York, USA. It was built about 1850 and is a -story, five-bay, center-hall-plan wood-frame dwelling in the Gothic Revival style. It features a steeply pitched, cross-gable roof with wood shingles.

It was listed on the National Register of Historic Places in 1996.

References

Houses on the National Register of Historic Places in New York (state)
Gothic Revival architecture in New York (state)
Houses completed in 1850
Houses in Orange County, New York
National Register of Historic Places in Orange County, New York